Glasgow Commercial Historic District is a national historic district located at Glasgow, Howard County, Missouri.   The district encompasses 31 contributing buildings in the central business district of Glasgow.  It developed between about 1867 and 1940 and includes representative examples of Second Empire, Italianate, and Queen Anne style architecture. Notable buildings include the Old City Hall (1867-1868), W. A. Meyer Grocery (1879), Henderson's Drug Store (1875), and Bank building/City Hall (1883).

It was listed on the National Register of Historic Places in 1992.

References

Historic districts on the National Register of Historic Places in Missouri
Second Empire architecture in Missouri
Italianate architecture in Missouri
Queen Anne architecture in Missouri
Buildings and structures in Howard County, Missouri
National Register of Historic Places in Howard County, Missouri